Thryptomene nealensis is a species of flowering plant in the family Myrtaceae and is endemic to central areas of Western Australia. It is a shrub with overlapping, decussate, linear leaves and pink flowers with five petals and usually five stamens.

Description
There are five, occasionally six stamens. Flowering occurs has been recorded in October.

Taxonomy
Thryptomene nealensis was first formally described in 1980 by John Green in the journal Nuytsia from specimens collected near Neale Junction in the Great Victoria Desert by Alex George in 1966. The specific epithet (nealensis) refers to the type location.

Distribution and habitat
This thryptomene is found on rocky breakaways in the Great Victoria Desert and Murchison biogeographic regions.

Conservation status
Thryptomene nealensis is classified as "Priority Three" by the Government of Western Australia Department of Parks and Wildlife meaning that it is poorly known and known from only a few locations but is not under imminent threat.

References

nealensis
Endemic flora of Western Australia
Rosids of Western Australia
Vulnerable flora of Australia
Plants described in 1980